The Faroe Islands Cup 2000 was played between March 12 and July 2, 2000. The cup was won by GÍ Gøta.

Preliminary round

| colspan="3" style="background:#9cc;"|March 12, 2000

|-
| colspan="3" style="background:#9cc;"|March 17, 2000

|}

First round

| colspan="3" style="background:#9cc;"|March 12, 2000

|}

Second round

Group 1

Group 2

Group 3

NOTE: TB Tvøroyri withdrew, therefore each team was awarded a 0-0 'win' in each match against them.

Quarterfinals

| colspan="3" style="background:#9cc;"|May 21, 2000

|}

Semifinals
The first legs were played on June 1, 2000 and the second legs on June 12, 2000.

|}

Final

See also

Faroe Islands Super Cup

References

External links
 RSSSF

Faroe Islands Cup seasons
Cup